Nomada sheppardana  is a Palearctic species of nomad bee.

References

External links
Images representing  Nomada sheppardana

Hymenoptera of Europe
Nomadinae
Insects described in 1802